Walter Barnard Byles (8 August 1840 – 12 November 1921) was an English first-class cricketer and barrister.

The son of Sir John Barnard Byles and Emma Nash Wedd, he was born in August 1840 at Royston, Hertfordshire. He was educated at Rugby School, before going up to University College, Oxford. While studying at Oxford, Byles made a single appearance in first-class cricket for Oxford University against the Gentlemen of England at Lord's in 1862. Batting once in the match, he was dismissed for 31 runs in the Oxford first-innings by Henry Plowden. A student of the Inner Temple, he was called to the bar in January 1866. He served as a barrister on the South-Eastern Circuit. Byles later served as a Sheriff of Middlesex in 1896. He died at Uxbridge in November 1921.

References

External links

1840 births
1921 deaths
People from Royston, Hertfordshire
People educated at Rugby School
Alumni of University College, Oxford
English cricketers
Oxford University cricketers
Members of the Inner Temple
English barristers
High Sheriffs of Middlesex